Anuru  is an Indian village in Peddapuram Mandal in Kakinada district of Andhra Pradesh in the southern part of India. Lord Sri Rama Sameta Satyanayarana Swamy temple has been constructed in 2007 with help of villagers as well as donors. Sri. N V Apparao garu is the president for this Temple Committee.

References

Pin codes of Kakinada district
Population Data for Anuru Village

Villages in Kakinada district